Peroxisomal trans-2-enoyl-CoA reductase is an enzyme that in humans is encoded by the PECR gene.

References

Further reading